"Step Back in Time" is a song by Australian singer Kylie Minogue from her third studio album, Rhythm of Love (1990). It was released as the album's second single on 22 October 1990, and distributed by PWL and Mushroom as a CD single, cassette tape and 12-inch and 7-inch singles. The track was written, arranged, and produced by Mike Stock, Matt Aitken, Pete Waterman, who are collectively known as Stock Aitken and Waterman, and was recorded in London, United Kingdom. Musically, it is a disco song that lyrically pays tribute to 1970s' culture.

"Step Back in Time" received positive reviews from music critics. Some had selected the single as one of Minogue's best work, and many complimented the backing track and production. Commercially, the single experienced success in regions such as Australia, United Kingdom, Finland, and Ireland, whilst peaking inside the top 40 in countries like France, New Zealand, and Switzerland. However, it was only certified Gold by the Australian Recording Industry Association (ARIA) for physical shipments of 35,000 units.

An accompanying music video was directed by visual artist Nick Egan, which paid homage to the 1970s culture and figures. The song has been performed on seven of Minogue's concert tours, the most recent being her Summer 2019 tour. Since its release, "Step Back in Time" has been used in several media including an appearance in the 2013 British comic science fiction film The World's End.

Background and composition
"Step Back in Time" was written, arranged, and produced by Mike Stock, Matt Aitken and Pete Waterman, collectively known as Stock, Aitken and Waterman. It was recorded in London, England, whilst Stock and Aitken provided instrumentation including keyboards, drums, trumpets and guitars; the song was mixed by Phil Harding and Ian Curnow. After Minogue's musical adaption to mainstream dance and disco music, particularly experimented with the predecessor single "Better the Devil You Know", "Step Back in Time" was composed as a disco song that intended to pay tribute to the 1970s culture and sound. According to Minogue's official website, the lyrical content "paid homage to the classic songs and dance moves of the disco era." However, Jon Kutner, who wrote the book 1000 UK Number One Hits, labelled the sound as a "jingly pop song". According to the demo sheet music at Music Notes published by Universal Music Publishing Group, the song is set in E Minor and has a time signature of common time with a tempo of 126 beats per minute. During the opening sequence and first verse, it has a chord progression of Em-D-G/D-Cm7♭5-C-Bm7-Em-D-C/D-Cm7♭5-C-Bm7-Em-Em9, and Minogue's vocals span between the notes B4 and B5. In retrospect, Waterman commented that the production and completion of "Step Back in Time" took longer to create than expected.

Release and reception

Originally, the follow-up single, "What Do I Have to Do?", from Rhythm of Love was intended to be released after "Better the Devil You Know", but PWL executives scrapped the idea and changed it to "Step Back in Time". "Step Back in Time" was released as the album's second single on 22 October 1990, and distributed by PWL and Mushroom. A standard 12-inch and 7-inch vinyl were released worldwide, and featured the original recording, instrumental version and the Walkin' Rhythm mix; in the UK, the original recording was omitted. In November 1990, a CD single was issued by PWL in Japan; it was distributed worldwide that same month. In France, a special mini CD included the original recording and instrumental version, alongside a cassette tape in Australia. As part of the PWL Archives, a 10-track EP was released on iTunes Store in 2009.

"Step Back in Time" received positive reviews from most music critics. British author and music critic Adrian Denning selected the single as the best offering on Rhythm of Love (1990), stating that he preferred it over the "more popular 'Better the Devil You Know'." Denning commended the production of the song, more so complimented the backing track. Similarly, Nick Levine from Digital Spy pointed out the song as one of the better cuts from the parent album. AllMusic's Chris True, who wrote the biography of Minogue on the website, selected the track amongst some of Minogue's best work. However, in a separate review of the single, True awarded the single two stars out of five.

Cameron Adams from the Herald Sun placed it at number 17 on his list of the singer's best songs in honor of her 50th birthday, writing that: "["Step Back in Time"] flips the script and makes it about the love of music. 'Remember the old days/Remember the O’Jays', Kylie sang for people who weren't old enough to remember the O’Jays. Heck, Kylie herself wasn't old enough to remember the O’Jays. But this is a brilliant homage to the disco anthem — Motown meets HiNRG meets Studio 54 — and indeed may have single-handedly laid the path for Disco Kylie, a touchstone of her career to this day". Olive Pometsey from GQ deemed it a "three-minutes-and-seven-seconds taste of what Studio 54 might have been like if ABBA had been regulars".

Commercial performance
Commercially, the single experienced success in regions such as Australia, United Kingdom, and Ireland. It debuted at number eight on the Australian Singles Chart, the highest debut of the chart week 2 December 1990, and peaked at number five the following week. The single was certified Gold by the Australian Recording Industry Association (ARIA) for physical shipments of 35,000 units in that region. It had a similar chart run on the UK Singles Chart, where it debuted at number nine, and peaked at number four the following week. It stayed inside the top 10 for three weeks, and the top 100 chart for eight weeks in total. It peaked at number four on the Irish Singles Chart, her second consecutive single to peak in that position after "Better the Devil You Know", and was present for six weeks in total.

Outside of these regions, "Step Back in Time" experienced moderate success. In New Zealand, it entered at number 36 on the singles chart. It peaked at number 21 in its third week, but fell outside the top 50 the following week. It peaked at number 19 in Sweden, and fell to number 20 the following week; it was present for two charting weeks. In the Belgium region Flanders, it debuted at number 22 and reached number 11 in its third week; it stayed there for three consecutive weeks, and stayed in the top 100 chart for 10 weeks. It stayed inside the German Singles Chart for 15 weeks, peaking at number 36, and peaked at number 23 on the French Singles Chart for the same charting span as the former chart. Elsewhere, the single reached number 29 in Switzerland and 36 on the Dutch Top 40 chart.

Music video
An accompanying music video was directed by visual artist Nick Egan in Los Angeles, Minogue's first video to have been shot outside of Australia or United Kingdom. According to British fashion designer and Minogue's long-term friend William Baker, who contributed to writing Minogue's biography Kylie: La La La (2002), he wrote that Minogue wanted to pay homage to the 1970s culture and figures, as she believed that was the era that celebrated disco music. The video opens with Minogue putting an 8-track tape in a stereo, and moves to moments with Minogue and back-up dancers dancing near a large cityscape; intercut scenes have Minogue in a blue room wearing colourful clothing. Minogue and the back-up dancers are driving in a red Cadillac throughout Los Angeles. Another shot, which inspired by the artwork of the single, featured Minogue in a green and pink dress dancing in front of the wall of patterns and lights. Throughout the video, majority of the scenes repeat and has Minogue singing the entire track. According to British author Sean Smith, who had written a biography detailing Minogue's career, the video "positioned Minogue as a dance artist", but stated that the public was "not convinced" and attracted negative commentary upon its release.

Live performances, other uses and appearances

"Step Back in Time" has been performed on several concert tours by Minogue. The track's first appearance was during her Rhythm of Love Tour, where it was the opening number. It appeared again as the opening track to Minogue's follow-up Let's Get to It Tour, and was included on the live release that was recorded in Dublin, Ireland. Seven years later, it was included on Minogue's 1998 Intimate and Live show, where it was sung on the third segment. It was next sung during her Hits Medley section of the 2001 On a Night Like This Tour, and was included on the live DVD of the show.

On her 2005 Showgirl: The Greatest Hits Tour in London, United Kingdom, a sample of the track was sung during the performance of her 2000 single "Spinning Around". This act was re-vamped and was sampled again on the show's extension Showgirl: The Homecoming Tour, which was a comeback after her diagnosis of breast cancer in May 2005. For Minogue's X Tour, the song appeared during the Black Verses White segment. "Step Back in Time" was also performed as part of a medley on the 2012 Queen's Diamond Jubilee concert in London, United Kingdom. It was also added to the set list of 2014-15's Kiss Me Once Tour and her 2015 summer tour.  Most recently, "Step Back in Time" was performed during Minogue's 2019 summer tour. "Step Back in Time" has appeared on numerous greatest hits compilation albums, throughout the years, conducted by Minogue, including Greatest Hits (1990), Ultimate Kylie (2004), K25: Time Capsule (2012) and Step Back In Time: The Definitive Collection (2019).

Formats and track listings

CD single
 "Step Back in Time" (Edit) – 3:05
 "Step Back in Time" (Walkin' Rhythm Mix) – 8:05
 "Step Back in Time" (Instrumental) – 3:30

12-inch vinyl
 "Step Back in Time" (Edit) – 3:05
 "Step Back in Time" (Walkin' Rhythm Mix) – 8:05
 "Step Back in Time" (Instrumental) – 3:30

UK 12-inch vinyl
 "Step Back in Time" (Walkin' Rhythm Mix) – 8:05
 "Step Back in Time" (Instrumental) – 3:30

Cassette single
 "Step Back in Time" (Edit) – 3:05
 "Step Back in Time" (Walkin' Rhythm Mix) – 8:05
 "Step Back in Time" (Instrumental) – 3:30

French mini CD
 "Step Back in Time" (Edit) – 3:05
 "Step Back in Time" (Instrumental) – 3:30

Digital EP
 "Step Back in Time" – 3:05
 "Step Back in Time" (Walkin' Rhythm Mix) – 7:58	
 "Step Back in Time" (Harding/Curnow Remix) – 6:45
 "Step Back in Time" (Tony King Remix) – 7:28
 "Step Back in Time" (Original 12-inch Mix) – 8:07
 "Step Back in Time" (7-inch Instrumental) – 3:29
 "Step Back in Time" (Extended Instrumental) – 4:58
 "Step Back in Time" (Backing Track) – 3:04
 "Secrets" (Instrumental) – 4:05
 "Secrets" (Backing Track) – 4:05

Credits and personnel
Credits are adapted from the CD liner notes of "Step Back in Time".

Recording and mixing
 Recorded in London, England, and mixed at Larrabee Studios, North Hollywood, California.

Personnel

 Kylie Minogue – vocals, backing vocals
 Linda Taylor – backing vocals
 Mae McKenna – backing vocals
 Peter Day – engineer
 Matt Aitken – songwriting, composing, keyboards, guitar, production
 Mike Stock – songwriting, composing, keyboards, production

 Pete Waterman – songwriting, composing, production
 Ian Curnow – mixing
 Phil Harding – mixing
 Markus Morianz – photography
 Nick Egan – music video director, packaging design

Charts

Weekly charts

Year-end charts

Certifications

References

External links
"Step Back in Time" at Kylie's official website (Archived).

Kylie Minogue songs
Disco songs
1990 songs
Song recordings produced by Stock Aitken Waterman
Mushroom Records singles
Pete Waterman Entertainment singles
1990 singles
Songs written by Pete Waterman
Songs written by Matt Aitken
Songs written by Mike Stock (musician)